The western grey gibbon (Hylobates abbotti), also known as Abbot's grey gibbon, is a primate in the gibbon family, Hylobatidae. It was named after zoologist William Louis Abbott.

Taxonomy 
Formerly, the western grey gibbon and northern grey gibbon (H. funereus) were considered conspecific with the southern grey gibbon (H. muelleri), but more recent studies indicate that all three are distinct species, and both the IUCN Red List and the American Society of Mammalogists consider them such.

Distribution 
The western grey gibbon is endemic to the western portion of Borneo, where it is found in both Kalimantan and Sarawak. It is found north of the Kapuas River and ranges as far east as Spaoh.

Conservation 
This species is thought to be endangered due to heavy deforestation in Borneo, as well as increases in forest fires exacerbated by El Niño events. It is also threatened by illegal hunting and capture for the pet trade.

References 

Western gray gibbon
Primates of Indonesia
Endemic fauna of Borneo
Mammals of Borneo
Mammals of Indonesia
Mammals of Malaysia
Endangered fauna of Asia
Species endangered by the pet trade
Western gray gibbon
Taxa named by C. Boden Kloss